Boris Becker was the defending champion but did not compete that year.

John McEnroe won in the final 6–4, 4–6, 6–4 against Jay Berger.

Seeds
The top eight seeds received a bye to the second round.

  Stefan Edberg (semifinals)
  John McEnroe (champion)
  Tim Mayotte (quarterfinals)
  Aaron Krickstein (semifinals)
  Jay Berger (final)
  Jaime Yzaga (second round)
  Peter Lundgren (second round)
  Todd Witsken (quarterfinals)
  Derrick Rostagno (first round)
  Richard Matuszewski (quarterfinals)
  Jim Pugh (first round)
  Pieter Aldrich (first round)
  Wally Masur (third round)
  Glenn Layendecker (second round)
  Michiel Schapers (third round)
  Richey Reneberg (second round)

Draw

Finals

Top half

Section 1

Section 2

Bottom half

Section 3

Section 4

References
 1989 GTE U.S. Men's Hard Court Championships Draw

1989 Singles
1989 Grand Prix (tennis)